See What's on the Inside is the seventh studio album by British rock band Asking Alexandria. The album was released on 1 October 2021 through Better Noise Music and was produced by Matt Good. The album is the first release from the band under Better Noise Music.

Background and promotion
On 7 June 2021, the band announced that they signed to Better Noise Music. On 20 August, the band surprise released a brand new single "Alone Again". At the same time, the band revealed the album itself, the album cover, the track list, and release date. Guitarist Ben Bruce commented about the track: "'Alone Again' and the rest of this album is the result of us reconnecting and falling back in love with why we started this band in the first place. No frills or cheap tricks, just the five of us playing our instruments as hard and as loud as we can!"

On 31 August, the band unveiled the official music video for "Alone Again". On 23 September, one week before the album release, the band teased on their social media the song "Faded Out" which would be available on 1 October. To promote the album, the band also announced that they will support A Day to Remember's rescheduled "The Re-Entry Tour" along with Point North in September 2021. On 27 September, the group announced their headlining European/UK Tour 2022 to support the album. On 1 October, in celebration of the album release, the band debuted the music video for the song "Never Gonna Learn".

On 20 May 2022, the band released the official music video of an alternate version of "Faded Out", with Sharon den Adel from the Dutch symphonic metal band Within Temptation as a guest singer. This version will feature in the upcoming movie The Retaliators.

Critical reception

The album received generally positive reviews from critics. Kerrang! gave the album 3 out of 5 and stated: "Ultimately, though, it's when Asking Alexandria dial up the drama like they do on 'Alone Again', the title-track, and cataclysmic closing number 'The Grey' that See What's on the Inside really takes flight. It's proof that Danny and co. have it in them to be far more than a polished radio-rock outfit, and if they harness that spectacle and theatre even more going forward, they could take on an intriguing, exciting form indeed." Louder Sound gave the album a positive review and stated: "This is the outrageously infectious sound of a band revelling in their influences and the creativity they inspire." Wall of Sound gave the album the score 7.5/10 and saying: "See What's on the Inside sees Asking Alexandria make a promising return to familiarity, producing some of their strongest tracks in the past four years. I definitely found this album a little more rounded and enjoyable than last year's release and you can tell that they've stripped it back, honed in on their roots and thought real hard about where they'd like to see themselves in the scene from here. No longer the same band from 2009, Asking Alexandria have established their musical style down melodically-driven paths and pulling at some deep emotions which will leave you feeling inspired. While they're yet to find that perfect harmony in their music to please everyone, this album does push them forward in the right direction for future releases."

Track listing

Personnel
Asking Alexandria
 Danny Worsnop – lead vocals
 Ben Bruce – lead guitar, backing vocals
 Cameron Liddell – rhythm guitar
 Sam Bettley – bass, piano
 James Cassells – drums

Additional personnel
 Matt Good – production, mixing
 Benjamin Bynum – engineering

Charts

References

2021 albums
Asking Alexandria albums
Albums produced by Matt Good